Zarrin Choqa (also Romanized as Zarrīn Choqā) is a village in Hasanabad Rural District, in the Central District of Ravansar County, Kermanshah Province, Iran. At the 2006 census, its population was 252, in 55 families.

References 

Populated places in Ravansar County